The 1344 Yellow River flood was a major natural disaster during the Yuan dynasty of Imperial China. The impact was devastating both for the peasants of the area as well as the leaders of the empire. The Yuan dynasty was waning, and the emperor forced enormous teams to build new embankments for the river. The terrible conditions helped fuel rebellions that led to the founding of the Ming dynasty.

As a result of the flood, the Yellow River shifted course south of the Shandong peninsula, where it remained for the next five hundred years until floods in the 1850s returned it to its more northerly course.

References

Yuan dynasty
Yellow River Flood, 1344
Yellow River Flood, 1344
Yellow River floods
14th-century floods